Kyle Markway (born March 4, 1997) is an American football tight end for the Michigan Panthers of the United States Football League (USFL). He played college football at South Carolina.

Professional career

New York Giants
After going undrafted in the 2020 NFL Draft, Markway signed with the New York Giants as an undrafted free agent on April 26, 2020. He was waived by the Giants on August 11, 2020.

Pittsburgh Steelers
Markway was signed by the Pittsburgh Steelers on August 22, 2020. Markway was waived by the Steelers on September 5, 2020.

Cleveland Browns
Markway was signed to the Cleveland Browns' practice squad on September 21, 2020. He was released by the Browns on October 13, 2020, and re-signed to their practice squad on November 10, 2020. Markway was elevated to the Browns' active roster on January 16, 2021, prior to the team's divisional playoff game against the Kansas City Chiefs, and reverted to the practice squad after the game.

Markway signed a reserve/futures contract with the Browns on January 18, 2021. He was waived on May 20, 2021.

Los Angeles Rams
On July 23, 2021, Markway signed a contract for the Los Angeles Rams. He was waived on August 24, 2021.

Cleveland Browns (second stint)
On August 25, 2021, Markway was claimed off waivers by the Cleveland Browns. Markway was waived by the Browns on August 31, 2021.

Los Angeles Rams (second stint)
On December 18, 2021, Markway was signed to the Los Angeles Rams practice squad. He was waived three days later.

On December 29, 2021, Markway was again signed to the Los Angeles Rams practice squad. Markway became a Super Bowl champion when the Rams won Super Bowl LVI against the Cincinnati Bengals. 

On February 15, 2022, Markway signed a reserve/future contract with the Rams. He was waived with an injury designation on August 4, 2022. He cleared waivers and was placed on injured reserve the next day. He was released off injured reserve on August 8, 2022.

Michigan Panthers
On December 13, 2022, Markway signed with the Birmingham Stallions of the United States Football League (USFL), but had his playing rights traded to the Michigan Panthers three days later.

References

1997 births
Living people
Players of American football from St. Louis
American football tight ends
South Carolina Gamecocks football players
New York Giants players
Pittsburgh Steelers players
Cleveland Browns players
Los Angeles Rams players
Birmingham Stallions (2022) players
Michigan Panthers (2022) players